Borokiri (also spelled Borikiri) is a neighborhood of the city of Port Harcourt situated just south of Old GRA in Rivers State, Nigeria. It lies at latitude 4.749° N and longitude 7.035° E. The neighborhood is bounded by Ahoada Street to the north, Okrika Island to the east (across Aboturu Creek), Orubiri oilfield to the south and Ship Builders Road to the west. Its land uses include residential, commercial, institutional and recreation.

Education
The following is a list of schools operating within this area:

Enitonna High School
Government Comprehensive Secondary School
New Covenant Secondary School
Nigerian Navy Secondary School
Our Lady of Fatima College
Wisdom Child International Schools 
Divine Nursery & Primary School
Divine International College
Springfield Nursery & Primary School
Sunrise School

References

External links

Neighbourhoods in Port Harcourt
Geography of Port Harcourt (local government area)